Jacob Plant (born 16 February 1991) is a British record producer and DJ. He's released on Ministry of Sound imprint label Speakerbox, Calvin Harris' Fly Eye Records and Steve Aoki's Dim Mak Records, and has been commissioned to officially remix songs for numerous high-profile artists including Rihanna, Calvin Harris, Tinie Tempah, Example, Axwell, Benny Benassi, Iggy Azalea and Sub Focus.

Plant has performed at several large festivals, including Reading and Leeds Festivals and Chicago's Lollapalooza festival in 2014. His debut EP, Warehouse, was released through his own label Shakedown Recordings. Jacob's music has earned playtime on BBC Radio 1 shows by DJs such as Annie Mac and Zane Lowe (who crowned "Fire" his Hottest Record in the World). His latest EP, Louder, was released in 2014 through Dim Mak Records.

Discography

Extended plays

Singles

References

British record producers
Living people
1991 births